Metacercops is a genus of moths in the family Gracillariidae.

Species
Metacercops cuphomorpha  (Turner, 1940) 
Metacercops hexactis  (Meyrick, 1932) 
Metacercops praestricta  (Meyrick, 1918)

External links
Global Taxonomic Database of Gracillariidae (Lepidoptera)

Acrocercopinae
Gracillarioidea genera